The following articles contain lists of villages in Hinthada District, Burma (Myanmar):
List of villages in Hinthada Township
List of villages in Ingapu Township
List of villages in Kyangin Township
List of villages in Laymyethna Township
List of villages in Myanaung Township
List of villages in Zalun Township